Oleksandr Kyrylyuk (born 28 September 1964 Lutsk, Ukrainian SSR) is a former Soviet and Ukrainian footballer and Ukrainian football coach.

Career
He worked as a manager of FC Cherkaskyi Dnipro, previously known as FC Dnipro Cherkasy and other club in Cherkasy Oblast. He also played extensively for FC Dnipro Cherkasy.

Kyrylyuk came to FC Dnipro Cherkasy back in 1987 when it was revived in KFK competitions under the name of Dnipro Heronymivka and stayed with it for the next eight years. That year Dnipro won the KFK competitions and were admitted to the Soviet Second League under the name of Dnipro Cherkasy.

In 2010, he also became the first coach of the once revived Dnipro Cherkasy, now under the name of Slavutych.

References

External links
 
 

1964 births
Living people
Footballers from Lutsk
Soviet footballers
Ukrainian footballers
FC Volyn Lutsk players
FC Dnipro Cherkasy players
FC Naftovyk-Ukrnafta Okhtyrka players
FC Hoverla Uzhhorod players
Ukrainian football managers
FC Dnipro Cherkasy managers
FC Khodak Cherkasy managers
FC Retro Vatutine managers
FC Cherkashchyna managers
Association football defenders
Sportspeople from Volyn Oblast